Zlata Razdolina (Rozenfeld) is a Russian Jewish composer, singer-songwriter and music performer. She is best known as being the author of the music for Requiem by Anna Akhmatova, The Song of the Murdered Jewish People by Itzhak Katzenelson, and hundreds of romances and songs based on poems by Russian classical poets, including Anna Akhmatova, Nikolay Gumilyov, Marina Tsvetayeva and Igor Severyanin.

Biography
Zlata Razdolina was born and obtained her musical education in Leningrad (St. Petersburg). She started playing piano at the age of four and wrote her first composition when she was five. By the age of 17, her music was recorded and played on the radio, and she was accepted to the Leningrad Union of Artists. She started her career by performing in the musical organization "Lenconcert".

She has received awards in many national and international music competitions. In 1988, she created the musical setting of Anna Akhmatova's poem "Requiem" which was later recognized as the best in an international competition. The "Requiem" was written for a symphony orchestra, choir and soloists. The composition was performed during the Anna Akhmatova centennial in the Kremlin in 1989, and later in Finland, Sweden, the Czech Republic, USA, and Israel.

After receiving wide acclaim for the "Requiem", she and her family became a target of threats and assaults by Russian nationalist organization Pamyat. Therefore, she decided to emigrate to Israel in 1990. In Israel, she performed together with singer Dudu Fisher on Israeli television.

In 1997, she set to music the poem The Song of the Murdered Jewish People by Itzhak Katzenelson, a well known Holocaust poet. Katzenelson was trapped in the Warsaw ghetto, participated in the uprising, and was murdered in Auschwitz in 1944. The composition was completed in 1997 and designed for symphony orchestra, choir and a soloist to be performed in Hebrew.

Discography
The songs of the murdered Jewish people - CD (2008)
Garden. Romances and songs on Marina Tsvetaevoj's verses (2008) - CD
Pineapples in a champagne (2008) - CD
The Neva water a drink - (2008) - CD
It have buried in a sphere terrestrial... (2008) - CD
REQUIEM and romances on Anna Ahmatovoj's verses, romances on Nikolay Gumileva's verses (2008) - CD
That has been favorite...  (2008) - CD

References

Links
Official website
Youtube channel
Vimeo channel
Brief biography
Her page on Akhmatova website 
Her page on Igor Severyanin website

Russian singer-songwriters
Russian composers
Jewish singers
Jewish songwriters
Jewish composers
Living people
Russian women singer-songwriters
Russian Jews
Soviet women singer-songwriters
Soviet singer-songwriters
Musicians from Saint Petersburg
20th-century Russian women singers
20th-century Russian singers
Year of birth missing (living people)